Andy Lewis (born October 7, 1986), is a professional stunt and safety coordinator, and extreme sports athlete, and particularly slacklining.

Early life
Lewis grew up in Greenbrae, California.

Legal troubles 
Lewis has been publicly known to be an enemy to women. Lewis was formally charged with criminal harassment against three women who dared question his “style.” The sexually violent threats are unprintable, but the charges were later dropped after Lewis entered a “no contest” plea.

Shortly thereafter, "Sketchy Andy" was put on probation at his place of employment at Skydive Moab. To this day there has been no reports of his employment with the skydiving facility being reinstated.

He has since gained a reputation, at least among critics, for pushing the limits of both safety and legality in his extreme sports exploits in southern Utah. Locals were rolling their eyes at the hypocrisy of “Sketchy Andy.”

Lewis has been fined after making a series of illegal BASE jumps in Arches National Park.

Slacklining career

Lewis played a major role in developing the sport of competitive tricklining, becoming the first-ever slackline world champion in 2008 in Fort William, Scotland. He repeated the feat in 2009, 2010, and 2011 winning Champion Overall at the Gibbon World Cup Series‘. Andy is also known for his many "first across” (F/A's) highlines where both scouting the line and figuring out how to rig the line are required before being the first one to walk across. He also holds the American record for longest highline, longest free solo, and highest walked slackline (between two hot air balloons.) He was the first to successfully rig and walk a 55m+ highline (2008, California – "Ruin's Highline"), the first to walk a 60m+ highline (2009, France – "King Line"), and rigged and walked the world's first 100m+ highline ever (2010, Moab – "Afrodisiac"). Andy is also renowned for his "free solo" exploits, having walked more than 100 different highlines without a safety leash. Andy's record for longest free solo highline held up until August 2015, with a 55m crossing at 60m high up— no leash. His leashed crossing in 2018, was nearly 3000’ long, walking 888m onsight (first try.)

Andy was included in Peter Mortimer's Reel Rock 2011 film, featured on MTV, and on other international TV networks. He is credited with taking slacklining from an obscure hobby of a small portion of rock climbers to the world media forefront on Sunday, February 5, 2012, when he performed on a trickline while Madonna sang behind him during the halftime show of the NFL Super Bowl. Saturday Night Live and Conan O'Brien's Late Night TV show parodied Andy's halftime performance in the week following the Super Bowl.

Utah monolith removal
Lewis and three others took credit and received a backlash for removing the Utah monolith on the evening of November 27, 2020. Lewis said their motivation in removing the sculpture was to protect the environment from overuse. However, it is seen by many that Lewis's statement directly contradicts his actions through his use of anchors drilled into cliff faces for his Slacklining events

References

1986 births
Living people
American stunt performers
Tightrope walkers
People from Santa Rosa, California
People from Greenbrae, California